Dorso-ventral may refer to:

 Anatomical term of location
 Dorsal consonant in linguistics